The Divine EP is an EP by producer and electronic musician Blaqstarr, released on January 25, 2011. Prior to the EP's release, Blaqstarr said that "There are no bounds for my music, so expect to experience every one of your best feelings when you listen to it." The EP's title derives from Blaqstarr's hope that "the release will kickstart his own divine mission."

Reviews

Track listing
All the World
Rider Girl
Oh My Darlin'
Divine
Wonder Woman
Turning Out

References

2011 EPs
Interscope Records EPs
Electronic EPs